FoodCorps is an American non-profit organization whose mission is to work with communities to "connect kids to healthy food in school." FoodCorps places service members in limited-resource communities where they spend a year working with teachers and students to establish farm to school programs, incorporate nutrition education into school curricula, plant school gardens, and engage in other initiatives to improve school food. Like Teach for America and Habitat for Humanity, FoodCorps is a grantee of AmeriCorps.

History
FoodCorps was founded in 2010 by six people:
  Curt Ellis, co-creator of the documentary King Corn and recipient of the Heinz Award 
 Debra Eschmeyer, formerly of the  National Farm to School Network and recipient of the James Beard Foundation Leadership Award. After serving as FoodCorps' Vice President of External Affairs for several years, Eschmeyer went on to become Executive Director of Michelle Obama's Let’s Move! initiative and Senior Policy Advisor for Nutrition Policy at the White House.
 Cecily Upton, formerly of Slow Food USA
 Crissie McMullan, Founder and former Director of Montana’s VISTA Farm to School program
 Jerusha Klemperer, Associate Director of National Programs for Slow Food USA
 Ian Cheney, Co-founder of the Yale Sustainable Food Project and co-creator of King Corn

Two of the six cofounders, Ellis and Upton, still work with the organization as Chief Executive Officer and VP of Innovation and Strategic Partnerships, respectively.

Function

FoodCorps’ mission statement is: "Together with communities, FoodCorps serves to connect kids to healthy food in school."

FoodCorps works by placing service members on year-long service stints at community-based Service Sites, where they work in low income public schools to improve nutrition. Statewide Host Sites oversee the Service Sites within each state in which FoodCorps operates.

FoodCorps Service Members are individuals generally between 18 and 30 years old, with backgrounds in agriculture, nutrition, health and food policy. They are paid a modest stipend ($15,000, health insurance, student loan forbearance, and a $5,500 Education Award) to perform a year of food and nutrition-related service inside local schools. The applicants are screened through a competitive vetting process (in FoodCorps’ first year, 1,229 candidates applied for 50 spots). The first FoodCorps class has 50 members. FoodCorps states that it hopes to have 1,000 Service Members in all 50 states by 2020.

Service Sites are community-based organizations that offer direct service opportunities in the fields of food and nutrition education, school gardens, and local procurement for school food systems. These are the locations to which Service Members report for day-to-day service. There are 41 Service Sites.

Host Sites are FoodCorps’ statewide partners which oversee the Service Sites. They are generally non-profit organizations, educational institutions or public agencies. In most cases, Host Sites determine the communities and non-profit organizations with which Members will work, and help create training and orientation opportunities for FoodCorps service members. The Host Site partners are:

 Arizona: The Johns Hopkins Center for American Indian Health
 Arkansas: National Center for Appropriate Technology
 California: Community Alliance with Family Farmers (CAFF) and Life Lab)
 Connecticut: University of Connecticut Extension
 Georgia: Georgia Organics
 Hawaii: The Kohala Center
 Iowa: Iowa State University Extension
 Maine: University of Maine Cooperative Extension
 Massachusetts: The Food Project
 Michigan: Michigan State University Extension
 Mississippi: National Center for Appropriate Technology
 Montana: National Center for Appropriate Technology
 New Jersey: Rutgers Cooperative Extension
 New Mexico: University of New Mexico - Office of Community Learning and Public Service and Farm to Table New Mexico 
 New York: Edible Schoolyard NYC
 North Carolina: Center for Environmental Farming Systems and North Carolina 4-H
 Oregon: Oregon Department of Agriculture
 Washington, D.C.: Office of the State Superintendent of Education (OSSE)

Philosophy

FoodCorps service members rely on a three-pillared model to accomplish their goal of creating a healthy food environment:
 Food and Nutrition Education to teach kids what healthy food is
 School Gardens to engage kids and community volunteers
 Farm to School programs to put local food in school lunch

See also
 AmeriCorps
 Childhood Obesity
 Farm to School

References

External links
 FoodCorps

Non-profit organizations based in the United States
Education in the United States
Organizations established in 2010
Service year programs in the United States
2010 establishments in the United States